The Luwan Gymnasium is a basketball arena, in Luwan District, Shanghai, China.  The arena is home to the Shanghai Sharks, a member of the Chinese Basketball Association.  The facility seats 3,000 people.

References 
Shanghai Cultural Information & Booking Centre

Indoor arenas in China
Sports venues in Shanghai
Shanghai Sharks
Basketball venues in China